Holsavatnet is a lake which lies in the municipality of Sunnfjord in Vestland county, Norway. The village of Holsen lies at the eastern end of the lake. The water from the lake eventually flows into the river Jølstra.

See also
List of lakes in Norway

References

Lakes of Vestland
Sunnfjord